Kuntz is a German surname. The name originated as a short form of Konrad meaning "bold adviser", or being "crafty" in German. In Yiddish the word is associated with a clever trick. In the Kashubian (Kaszëbë) area name Kuntz comes from kashubian language name "Kunc" also "Kunz" means last farmer or farmer at the end of the road. The surname is frequent around Puck where during the Prussian occupation name was frequently changed from Slavonic sound kunc (polish koniec) to Kunz or Kuntz. This type of change of names was frequent for all Kashubian names like Lesna to Lesnau, Piontka to Piontke, etc.   Notable people with the surname include:

 Alan Kuntz (1919–1987), Canadian ice hockey player
 Andy Kuntz (born 1962), German progressive metal singer
 Bobby Kuntz (died 2011), Canadian football linebacker
 Harry Kuntz (died 1973), Canadian politician 
 Júlio Kuntz, Brazilian footballer
 Marcel Kuntz, French plant biologist
 Murray Kuntz (born 1945), Canadian ice hockey right winger
 Robert J. Kuntz (born 1955), American game designer
 Roger Kuntz (died 1975), an American landscape painter
 Russell "Rusty" Kuntz (born 1955), American baseball player
 Stefan Kuntz (born 1962), German footballer
 Terry Kuntz (born 1953), American game designer
 Thomas Kuntz (born 1965), American multi-media artist
 Tom Kuntz (born 1972), American filmmaker

See also
 Cuntz, a surname
 Kuntze, surname
 Kunze, a surname
 Counts, a surname

Surnames from given names
German-language surnames